Mei-Yin Chou (born 1958) is a Taiwanese physicist.

Background 
Chou earned a bachelor's degree in physics from National Taiwan University, followed by a master's degree and doctorate in the same field, both from the University of California, Berkeley. She completed postdoctoral research with Exxon, and joined the Georgia Institute of Technology faculty in 1989. Chou received a two-year fellowship from the Alfred P. Sloan Foundation between 1990 and 1992, as well as a five-year fellowship from the David and Lucile Packard Foundation (1990–1995).

Career 
She became an associate professor at Georgia Tech in 1993, and was promoted to full professor in 1998. Chou held the Advance Professorship in Science from 2002 to 2006, and chaired the physics department between 2005 and 2010. She returned to Taiwan to assume the directorship of the Institute of Atomic and Molecular Sciences at Academia Sinica, and took a joint adjunct professorship at National Taiwan University.

She was elected a fellow of the American Physical Society in 2002, and elected to membership within Academia Sinica in 2014. Chou was considered one of three finalists for the position of president of Academia Sinica in 2016. After Kuo Way withdrew from consideration and James C. Liao was selected, Chou was appointed one of three vice presidents. In late 2017, Chou was one of eight finalists considered for the position of National Taiwan University president. Chou remained in the running until the final round of five candidates.

References

1958 births
Living people
Taiwanese women physicists
20th-century Taiwanese physicists
21st-century Taiwanese physicists
National Taiwan University alumni
UC Berkeley College of Letters and Science alumni
Georgia Tech faculty
Members of Academia Sinica
Fellows of the American Physical Society
Sloan Research Fellows